Baugo Community Schools is a school district located in Elkhart, Northern Indiana, in the United States.

Approximately 1,900 students attend Baugo Community Schools, run by the Baugo Community School Corporation.

References 

School districts in Indiana
Education in Elkhart County, Indiana